This is a partial list of artists working in mixed media.

A

Arman

B
Romare Bearden
Natasha Bowdoin
Christian Boltanski
Kate Borcherding
Georges Braque
Geta Bratescu

C
Rhea Carmi
Peter I. Chang
Joseph Cornell

D
Edgar Degas
Jim Dine
Jesse Draxler
Hubert Duprat
Marcel Duchamp

E
Max Ernst

F
Abdala Faye
Emma Ferreira
Jane Frank

G
Lori K. Gordon
Juan Gris
Red Grooms
Genco Gulan
Ismail Gulgee

H
Dick Higgins
Robert H. Hudson

J
Jasper Johns

K
Edward Kienholz
Paul Klee
Yves Klein
Alison Knowles
Kudzanai Chiurai

L
Marita Liulia
Lennie Lee
Minouk Lim

M
JG Mair
Conrad Marca-Relli
Jim McNitt
Christina McPhee
Annette Messager
Christa Membrandt

N
Afshin Naghouni

O 
Ahmet Ögüt
Claes Oldenburg
Méret Oppenheim

P
Patricia Piccinini
Francis Picabia
Pablo Picasso
Nam June Paik
Laure Prouvost
Kim Prisu

R
Sara Rahbar
Barbara Rapp
Chitra Ramanathan
Mary Curtis Ratcliff
Robert Rauschenberg
Man Ray
Wendy Red Star
Diana Ringo
Mateo Romero
Bob Ross
Anne Ryan

S
Kurt Schwitters
Tanis Maria S'eiltin
Hilary Simon
Jack Smith
Julian Schnabel
Daniel Spoerri

T
PINK de Thierry
Jean Tinguely

V
Damien Valero
Jacques Villeglé
Wolf Vostell
Bill Viola

W
Tom Wesselmann
Lara Williams

Mixed